Francis Chandida (born 28 May 1979) is a former Zimbabwean football midfielder.

He has been capped for the Zimbabwean national team.
He scored the winning goal in the 2005 COSAFA Cup, and was in the Zimbabwean squad for the 2006 African Cup of Nations. He was an influential figure in the Zimbabwe national team in the mid-2000s

Chandida played for Shababie Mine from 2000 to 2002 and he won the Bp league Cup and played in the zifa unity cup final with the asbestos miners. In 2002 he joined Dynamos for a record ZW$4.5 million,he played for 2 seasons before he joined another Harare based outfit Buymore. Despite playing all the qualifying games for Tunisia Afcon 2004 tournament, Chandida missed out on the final selection for the tournament. In 2006 he was part of the final squad for the afcon tournament.

Clubs
2001–2002:  Shabanie Mine FC
2003–2004:  Dynamos FC
2005–2006:  Buymore FC

References

1979 births
Living people
Zimbabwean footballers
Zimbabwe international footballers
2006 Africa Cup of Nations players
Dynamos F.C. players
Beerschot A.C. players
Association football midfielders